Lukas Rath (born 18 January 1992) is an Austrian association football player. He plays as a defender.

Club career
On 22 September 2020, he signed with Admira Wacker.

References

External links

1992 births
Living people
Austrian footballers
Association football defenders
SV Mattersburg players
FC Admira Wacker Mödling players
Austrian Football Bundesliga players
2. Liga (Austria) players
Austria youth international footballers
Austria under-21 international footballers